Elemag or Elinag Phrantzes was, according to the history of John Skylitzes, the governor of Belegrada (modern Berat in Albania) for the First Bulgarian Empire in 1018, when the Byzantine emperor Basil II completed the Byzantine conquest of Bulgaria. Elemag, together with his co-governors, went and met Basil II at Stagoi, and declared his submission, surrendering his province to the emperor.

He was granted the title of patrikios and sent to live at Thessalonica. Elemag was later accused of conspiring to restore an independent Bulgarian realm along with the patrikios Gabras, but whereas Gabras fled, was captured, and blinded, Elemag remained behind, denied the accusations, and was reinstated in his rank. Elemag may also be the Phrantzes who was a donor of the St. Panteleimon Monastery on Mount Athos.

Elemag Reef on Livingston Island, Antarctica, has been named after him.

References

Sources
 
 

11th-century Bulgarian people
11th-century Byzantine people
Bulgarian people of the Byzantine–Bulgarian Wars
History of Berat
Patricii